Surf Air Mobility is an American electric aviation company. It is the parent company of Surf Air and BlackBird Air, and has entered into an agreement to acquire Ampaire, a $100 million acquisition abandoned by April 2022.

History 
Surf Air Mobility was formed in February 2020 following the acquisition of BlackBird Air. The company also controls Surf Air, a private air travel company providing the ability to access short-haul regional flights that range from 50 to 500 miles.

In September 2020, Surf Air Mobility secured a commitment for $200 million in funding from Global Emerging Markets Group (GEM).

In February 2021, Surf Air Mobility entered an agreement to acquire Ampaire, an electric aviation company that develops hybrid-electric powertrains for aircraft such as the Ampaire Electric EEL based on the Cessna 337 and the Cessna Grand Caravan. Axios has likened the aircraft to the "Prius of airplanes."

In July 2021, Surf Air Mobility announced that it has entered into a relationship with Textron Aviation to develop an electrified Cessna Grand Caravan, beginning with a hybrid electric Cessna Grand Caravan aircraft. Surf Air Mobility has agreed to purchase up to 150 Cessna Grand Caravan EX single-engine turboprops, with an initial fleet order of 100 aircraft and an option for 50 more.

References 

Airlines of the United States
Airlines established in 2020
Airlines based in California
2020 establishments in California
American companies established in 2020